Tautira Bay (alternate: Cooks Anchorage)  (lat 17°45' S, long. 149° 10' W) is located on the island of Tahiti in French Polynesia. It is part of the commune Taiarapu-Est. It is formed by Tautira Point and reef on the eastern side, and by the barrier reef on the western side. It is reached through a gap in the reef about half a mile wide, with deep water, with Tautira point giving it protection from winds from north-east. The bay opens to the northwest, affording protection with winds from northeastward through east and south to west-northwestward, but can be dangerous with those between north and west-northwestward. James Cook anchored several times in this bay, from which circumstance the name is derived. The depth in the middle of the entrance is from 35 to 60 fathoms, diminishing gradually to the shore. The bay is clear, except a small patch of 2 fathoms  southward of the point of reef on the western side. The eastern and southeastern shore is lined with a sandy beach.

The harbor in Tautira Bay is Te-'afa ("the crack").

See also
Vaitepiha River

References

Bodies of water of Tahiti
Bays of French Polynesia